Jean-Pierre Laurant (born 1935) is a French historian of esotericism.

Biography 
Laurant was born in 1935 in Paris and studied at the Lycée Claude Bernard. Two major early influences were Julien Gracq and Jean-René Huguenin, in whose weekly Arts Laurant published.

After studying history at the Sorbonne, Laurant taught at the lycée in Soissons, Picardy. He was elected mayor of the commune of Vézaponin (population 109-129 persons), near Soissons.

In 1975, he started to give pioneering courses on nineteenth- and twentieth-century esotericism at the Ecole pratique des hautes études.

Laurant was a founder and director of Politica hermetica, an influential association for the study of the social influence of esoteric thought that published a journal of the same name.

In 1990, he received the degree of docteur ès lettres from the University of Paris XII.

Select bibliography
 L'ésotérisme chrétien en France au XIXe siècle  
 Matgioi, un aventurier taoïste 
 René Guénon 
 L'Ésotérisme 
 René Guénon: Les enjeux d'une lecture (2006) 
 L'Antimaçonnisme catholique, with Émile Poulat, Paris, Berg international, 2006

References
Jean-Pierre Brach and Jérôme Rousse-Lacordaire, Introduction, In Etudes d’histoire de l’ésotérisme: mélanges offerts à Jean-Pierre Laurent, Jean-Pierre Brach and Jérôme Rousse-Lacordaire, eds, Paris: Editions du Cerf, 2007, pp. 17–20.

1935 births
Writers from Paris
Living people
Lycée Louis-le-Grand alumni
Academic staff of the École pratique des hautes études
20th-century French historians
Western esotericism scholars